Regina Höfer (née Pippig; born 18 October 1947, in Leipzig) is a retired East German athlete who specialized in the 100 metres and 100 metres hurdles.

She competed in 80 metres hurdles at the 1966 European Championships without reaching the final. In 1968 she joined the sports club SC DHfK Leipzig, and trained under coach Karl-Heinz Balzer and with fellow athletes like Karin Balzer and Christina Heinich.

She won a gold medal in 4x100 metres relay at the 1969 European Championships, together with teammates Bärbel Podeswa, Renate Meißner and Petra Vogt. In addition she placed sixth in both the 100 metres and 100 metres hurdles.

References 

1947 births
Living people
East German female sprinters
East German female hurdlers
Athletes from Leipzig
SC DHfK Leipzig athletes
European Athletics Championships medalists